Andrea Angiolino (born April 27, 1966, in Rome, Italy) is a game designer. Among his last boardgames, Dragon Ball - Alla ricerca delle sette sfere (Nexus Editrice 1998), Ulysses (Winning Moves 2001), Wings of War (Nexus Editrice 2004, then NG International, now published as Wings of Glory by Ares Games), Battlestar Galactica: Starship Battles (Ares Games 2018), Isla Dorada (FunForge 2010, English edition by Fantasy Flight Games), and the card game Obscura Tempora (Rose & Poison 2005). He wrote several role-playing games: among them Orlando Furioso, written with Gianluca Meluzzi, published by the City Council of Rome to be distributed in schools and public libraries. He also created games for radio and TV, magazines, training, advertising, festivals and shows.

He is a professional journalist specialized in games: he started with a column about role-playing games on the Italian monthly magazine Pergioco in September 1982, together with Gregory Alegi, and then worked for many national newspaper and magazines, radio broadcasts and Internet sites.

He wrote more than 20 books, some of which translated into several languages, and created several game CD-Roms. His main work is a "Games Dictionary" (Dizionario del Gioco, with Beniamino Sidoti, Zanichelli 2010) with more than 6500 entries and nearly 1200 pages.
He has been the first Italian author to publish a choose-your-own-story gamebook, "In Cerca di fortuna" (Ripostes 1987) and the first to publish one for kids who can not read: "Il Mischiastorie - Osvaldo e i cacciatori" (Lapis 2005, illustrated by Valeria De Caterini).

He also published a few fantasy short stories and an encyclopaedia of the fantastic world of Warhammer, described as if it were real (Hobby & Work, Games Workshop & Nexus Editrice 1996).

He published two manuals about the use in schools and libraries of gamebooks and role-playing games, and he also gives lessons to teachers and librarians about the use of games in general.

In 1999 the Italian Ministry for Public Teaching named him "Expert Game Inventor". In November 2004, he received the first Special Best of Show for Distinguished Achievements from the Lucca Games show. In summer 2008 he has been awarded the Personalità Ludica dell'Anno 2007 (Game Person of the Year 2007) prize.

Main works in English 

 Andrea Angiolino, "Super Sharp Pencil & Paper Games", Sterling 1995 (reprinted in 2003 as "Mind Sharpening Logic Games")
 Andrea Angiolino & Pier Giorgio Paglia, "Wings of War - Famous Aces", Nexus Editrice 2004
 Andrea Angiolino & Pier Giorgio Paglia, "Wings of War - Watch your back!", Nexus Editrice 2005
 Andrea Angiolino, "Obscura Tempora", Rose & Poison 2005.
 Andrea Angiolino & Pier Giorgio Paglia, "Wings of War - Burning Drachens", Nexus Editrice 2006
 Andrea Angiolino & Pier Giorgio Paglia, "Wings of War - Dawn of War", Nexus Editrice 2007
 Andrea Angiolino & Pier Giorgio Paglia, "Wings of War - Fire from the Sky", NG International 2009
 Andrea Angiolino & Pier Giorgio Paglia, "Wings of War WW2 Miniatures - Deluxe set", NG International 2009
 Andrea Angiolino & Pier Giorgio Paglia, "Wings of War - Flight of the Giants", NG International 2009
 Andrea Angiolino & Pier Giorgio Paglia, "Wings of War Miniatures - Revised Deluxe set", NG International 2010
 Andrea Angiolino, "Earthquakes how and why", Giunti 2010
 Bruno Faidutti, Alan R. Moon, Andrea Angiolino & Pier Giorgio Paglia, "Isla Dorada", FunForge 2010
 Andrea Angiolino & Pier Giorgio Paglia, "Wings of Glory - WW2 Starter Set", Ares Games 2012
 Andrea Angiolino & Pier Giorgio Paglia, "Wings of Glory - WW1 Rules & Accessories Pack", Ares Games 2012
 Andrea Angiolino & Pier Giorgio Paglia, "Wings of Glory - WW2 Rules & Accessories Pack", Ares Games 2013
 Andrea Angiolino & Pier Giorgio Paglia, "Wings of Glory - WW1 Duel Pack", Ares Games 2013
 Andrea Angiolino & Andrea Mainini, "Sails of Glory - Napoleonic Wars", Ares Games 2013
 Andrea Angiolino & Andrea Mainini, "Battlestar Galactica: Starship Battles", Ares Games 2018

References

External links 
 Personal site

Board game designers
Living people
1966 births
Italian video game designers